CSM Slatina may refer to:

 CSM Slatina (football), a men's football club
 CSM Slatina (women's handball), a women's handball club